MovieLabs is an independent non-profit organization founded by Disney, Paramount, Twentieth Century Fox, Sony Pictures, Universal, and Warner Bros. studios to advance research and development in motion picture distribution and protection. It maintains project engineering, technology market analysis and standards development/evangelism among its core areas of focus and partners with leading universities, corporations, technology startups, service providers, and standards bodies to further explore innovative technologies in the field of digital media.

Key publications and standards available through MovieLabs include:
- Entertainment ID Registry (EIDR)
- Common Metadata
- Content Availability Metadata (Avails)
- Common Metadata Ratings
- Next Generation/HDR Video
- Enhanced Content Protection (ECP)
- Creative Works Ontology

References

Non-profit organizations based in the United States